Gustavo Henrique Barbosa Freire  (born 11 January 1996), known as Gustavo Tocantins or simply Tocantins, is a Brazilian professional footballer who plays as a forward for Indonesian club Barito Putera.

Club career

Corinthians
Gustavo Tocantins is a youth exponent from Corinthians. He made his Série A debut at 11 October 2014 against Botafogo.

Tocantins was loaned to Bragantino on 27 April 2015. He made his debut for the team at the Série B against CRB on May 10. Tocantins also played against Bahia on June 6, before being called back to Corinthians on June 12.

In February 2016, Tocantins was loaned to Portuguesa. He was the club's top goalscorer in Campeonato Paulista Série A2 with six goals.

Estoril
In June 2016, Tocantins moved abroad and signed for Portuguese Primeira Liga club Estoril.

References

1996 births
Living people
Sportspeople from Tocantins
Brazilian footballers
Association football forwards
Campeonato Brasileiro Série A players
Campeonato Brasileiro Série B players
Liga 1 (Indonesia) players
Sport Club Corinthians Paulista players
Clube Atlético Bragantino players
Associação Portuguesa de Desportos players
G.D. Estoril Praia players
Londrina Esporte Clube players
U.D. Vilafranquense players
S.C.U. Torreense players
SC São João de Ver players
Anadia F.C. players
Persikabo 1973 players
PS Barito Putera players
Brazil youth international footballers
Brazilian expatriate footballers
Brazilian expatriate sportspeople in Portugal
Expatriate footballers in Portugal
Brazilian expatriate sportspeople in Indonesia
Expatriate footballers in Indonesia